The 1923 Alberta prohibition plebiscite, held on November 5, 1923, was a province-wide plebiscite held in Alberta, Canada, to allow alcoholic beverages. It was triggered by an affirmative vote in the Legislative Assembly of Alberta and based on the presentation of a 56,000-name petition in accordance with the requirements of the Direct Legislation Act (1913), a citizens referendum law or initiative law, which was in force at the time. 

Prohibition was defeated by nearly 58 percent (58%) of the vote and was replaced by the government sale of liquor and strictly-regulated taverns. Liquor would be sold in government stores, and the government took out the profit motive for "pushing" alcohol and engaged in little advertising to encourage sales. Consumers of liquor had to buy permits, which, if misused, could be "interdicted." As well, after the end of prohibition, the government brought in the local option vote and so communities could hold votes to prohibit sales of liquor in their communities. Cardston, for example, is a town that voted to uphold prohibition by plebiscite as recently as 2014. Prohibition was abolished in the last few prohibition areas in the province on June 17, 2020, but under the new provincial legislation, those areas will remain a dry until their respective councils pass motions to allow liquor sales.

Campaign
The writs were issued to Alberta's 52 electoral districts (under the 1921 boundaries) on October 9, 1923.
There were four options presented to votes and voting was by ranked voting, as favored by the United Farmers government, and voters ranked the four options given.

In the event, one option, government sale of liquor and private taverns selling beer, won on the first count and so no following preferences had to be considered.

The Prohibition Committee was a campaign committee set up for the plebiscite to campaign for Option A, the option to continue the Liquor Act as it was before the plebiscite.
The Prohibitionists had a seven-point platform. Point one encouraged voters to respect the laws already on the books. Point two stated that every constitutional method should be used to enact a change in law when the majority of voters desired a change. Points three, four, and five focused on highlighting harm done by alcohol to the fabric of the community and contended that society is incumbent upon itself to ban such harm.
Point six encouraged the crackdown and banning of liquor distilling in Alberta and its exportation outside the province. Point seven supported the committee's satisfaction with the Liquor Act in force to that point. The committee believed that the current legislation was the means to the end and allowed for efforts to be sustained until total prohibition was achieved.

The Moderation League of Alberta was the committee campaigning for Option D, government control.

Results

(d) won a clear majority on the first ballot; no extra count was required.

References 

Works cited
 
 
 

1923 elections in Canada
1923
1923 in Alberta
November 1923 events
Multiple-choice referendums